The Barga (Mongol: Барга) are a subgroup of the Buryats which gave its name to the Baikal region – "Bargujin-Tukum" (Bargujin Tökhöm) – "the land's end", according to the 13th-14th centuries Mongol people's conception.

History

In the 7–8th centuries, ancestors of Bargas, the Bayirku, a Turkic tribe appeared as tribes near Lake Baikal, named Bargujin. In "Old Tangs Book", it was called "拔野古", "拔野固", "拔曳固".

Genghis Khan's ancestor Alan Gua was of Barga ancestry. In the Mongol Empire, they served the Great Khans' armies. One of them named Ambaghai commanded the artillery. Manlaibaatar Damdinsüren and Khorloogiin Choibalsan were the famous military commander from Barga in the early 20th century.

Xianbei Period 
The Barga supported the XianBei invasion of China and provided 8,000 horse cavalry.

Second Turkic khaganate Period 
The Barga (Bayegu) had revolted in 707. These revolts continued until 716 and Qapaghan Qaghan, on his way back from suppressing revolts by the Uyghur, Tongluo, Baixi, Barga (Bayegu) and Pugu, was ambushed and killed by a Barga tribesman named Sijelu on 716 July 22.

14th to 17th centuries
After the fall of the Yuan dynasty in 1368, the Barga joined the Oirats against the Genghisids. However, they were scattered among the Mongols and Oirats. The Barga share the same 11 clans into which the Khori-Buryats were divided. The main body of Khori-Barga moved to the area between Ergune river and the Greater Khingan Range where they became subject to the Daurs and Solon Ewenkis. A large body of Barga Khoris fled back east to the Onon river in 1594. While some came under Russian rule, others became tributary to the Khalkha.

Qing dynasty Period
When the Qing dynasty attacked the Cossacks in the Ergune and Shilka rivers in 1685–89, those Barga Mongols east of the Ergune River were deported to Manchuria. The Qing court dispersed them among the Chahar banners. They predominantly live Hulunbuir since the 17th century.

In 1900~1901 Russia-Manchuria Railway conflict, Manchurian commander QuanFu led local defensive force and fought against Russian soldiers at Ongon railway station and Hargantu railway stations. 800 Barga/Solon native soldiers were killed in the event.

Relocation - Old Barga ("Huuchin Barga" in Mongolian) 
After the Treaty of Nerchinsk, Qing dynasty decided to increase the defensive line of HulunBuir against Russian influence.

In 1732, under the command of Qing commander Tabhan and Bulbantsa, total 3000 (1636 Solon soldiers, 730 Dagur soldiers, 275 Barga soldiers and 359 Orqon soldiers) were selected and stationed in Hulunbuir mostly from non Muren area. After 2000 soldiers were forced to join Dzungar-Qing wars in 1733, mostly Barga soldiers were left to protect this area. They became "Old Barga", since they arrived before New Barga.

Relocation - New Barga ("Shine Barga" in Mongolian) 
In order to support Dzungar–Qing Wars, 2000 Solon Barga soldiers were selected by Qing commander Jorhai in 1733 to fight against Dzungar and local defence was left with merely 1,100 soldiers. Thus it became extremely important to increase local defense against Russian Cossack.

In 1734, the Barga Mongols who had been left under the Khalkha noyans complained of the mistreatment of their lords and the Qing authority selected 2,984 Barga Mongolian soldiers in Khalkha and stationed them with their families in Khölönbuir, Dornod. They became "New Barga", since they arrived after Old Barga.

Military Support to Qing dynasty 
In 1733, 2000 soldiers (mostly Solon Barga soldiers from the forest tribes) were forced to join Dzungar-Qing Wars. They never returned.

In 1755, 3000 Barga soldiers were forced to join Dzungar-Qing Wars. They never returned.

In 1758, 3000 Barga teenagers were forced to join Dzungar-Qing Wars, since there were not enough adults. They never returned.

In 1840, some Barga soldiers (numbers unknown) joined First Opium War, and some of them returned home in 1841.

In other occasions, 750~50 Barga soldiers were selected to support Qing dynasty campaigns for around 20 times.

In 1901, 800 local Barga soldiers were killed in Chinese Eastern Railway construction.

Japanese Occupation Period 
In 1939, local Barga people were forced to join Soviet–Japanese border conflicts.
The unclear border definition between New Barga Left Banner and Dornod (where Barga originally lived) was the major excuse for the start of Battles of Khalkhin Gol.

PRC China Period

Genetics 
Derenko et al. (2012) tested blood samples of 149 unrelated Barghuts collected in different localities of Hulun Buir Aimak, Inner Mongolia, China. The mtDNA of the sampled Barghuts belonged predominantly to East Eurasian haplogroups, in particular haplogroup D4 (52/149 = 34.9%), haplogroup C4 (24/149 = 16.1%), and haplogroup G2a (13/149 = 8.7%), with those three clades by themselves accounting for approximately 60% of the entire sample. Their D4 mtDNA is diverse, with the most frequently observed subclades being D4j (TMRCA 16,210 [95% CI 10,600 <-> 21,970] ybp; 14/149 = 9.4% D4j, including 4/149 D4j9, 3/149 D4j3, 3/149 D4j*, 1/149 D4j1a, 1/149 D4j2, 1/149 D4j4, and 1/149 D4j5) and D4b (TMRCA 28,440 [95% CI 19,260 <-> 37,960] ybp; 12/149 = 8.1% D4b, including 5/149 D4b1a2, 2/149 D4b2b1c, 2/149 D4b2c, 2/149 D3, and 1/149 D4b1a1). Their haplogroup C4 mtDNA is somewhat less diverse, with half belonging to the C4a1a subclade (TMRCA 11,330 [95% CI 6,090 <-> 16,720] ybp; 12/149 = 8.1% C4a1a, including 6/149 C4a1a1, 3/149 C4a1a2, 1/149 C4a1a, 1/149 C4a1a1a2, and 1/149 C4a1a2a2). The Barghuts' G2a mtDNA predominantly belongs to the G2a1 subclade (9/149), but G2a5 (2/149) and G2a* (2/149) are also represented. Among the rarer mtDNA haplogroups of East Eurasian origin, B4c1a2 (TMRCA 7,000 [95% CI 3,120 <-> 10,960] ybp; 5/149 = 3.4% B4c1a2) stands out for its being relatively common among the sampled Barghuts. A minority (12/149 = 8.1%) of the sampled Barghuts belonged to West Eurasian mtDNA haplogroups U (7/149 = 4.7% U, including 1/149 U2e1, 1/149 U5b1b1, 1/149 U7a, 2/149 U8a1, 1/149 K1a13, and 1/149 K2a5) and HV (5/149 = 3.4% HV, including 1/149 H20, 1/149 H5a, 1/149 H7b, 1/149 HV1a, and 1/149 HV5).

The Y-DNA of Barghuts is similar to that of Buryats, with both populations bearing mainly C-M407 and N-Tat. Malyarchuk et al. (2016) tested a sample of 76 Barghut males and assigned their Y-DNA to C-M407 (42/76 = 55.3%), N-Tat (21/76 = 27.6%), and C-M217(xM407) (8/76 = 10.5%), with singletons belonging to haplogroup G-M201, haplogroup J2a-M410, haplogroup T-M70, haplogroup O2-M122, and haplogroup R2a-M124.

Economy 
The Barga economy is mostly nomadic based from the 8th century to now. After 2010, the Barga economy starts to have some sign of early industrialization.

1907 statistics by Mairan Jangi Somonsurong 
In 1907, there were over 1,764,457 domestic animals raised by Barga, including 170,172 horses, 124,398 cattle, 9,011 camels, 1,407,586 sheep and 53,290 goats.

New Barga took 76.8% of domestic animals and Old Barga took the rest.

Other records 
Local folks have a lot of tales about Bayan Barga Rich families.

 Dimin Ogorda had 10,000 horses during the Qing dynasty period.
 Jingdi Jangi had 12,000 horses during the Japanese occupation period.
 Yorong Jangi had 20,000 sheep.
 Bosang Hafan had 1,000 white cows.

References

External links
 Barag tribe

Ethnic groups in Mongolia
Ethnic groups in China
Mongol peoples
Buryat people
Indigenous peoples of North Asia
Inner Mongolia